Edward Douglass White is bronze sculpture depicting the American politician and jurist of the same name by Arthur C. Morgan, installed in the United States Capitol Visitor Center, in Washington, D.C., as part of the National Statuary Hall Collection. The statue was donated by the U.S. state of Louisiana in 1955.

References

External links
 

1955 establishments in Washington, D.C.
1955 sculptures
Bronze sculptures in Washington, D.C.
Monuments and memorials in Washington, D.C.
White, Edward Douglass
Sculptures of men in Washington, D.C.